Marwar Bhinmal railway station is a railway station in Jalor district, Rajasthan. Its code is MBNL. It serves Bhinmal town. The station consists of 2 platforms. Passenger, Express and Superfast trains halt here.

Trains

The following trains halt at Marwar Bhinmal railway station in both directions:

 Yesvantpur–Barmer AC Express
 Bhagat Ki Kothi–Ahmedabad Weekly Express
 Bikaner–Dadar Superfast Express
 Gandhidham–Jodhpur Express
 Bhagat Ki Kothi–Bandra Terminus Express (via Bhildi)

References

Railway stations in Jalor district
Jodhpur railway division